Madeline Jane "Maddy" Price (born 11 September 1995) is a Canadian athlete. A specialist in the 400 metres distance, she competes as part of the Canadian relay team. In her inaugural World Championships appearance at the 2019 World Athletics Championships in Doha, she was a participant in the mixed 4 × 400 metres relay. As a part of the women's 4x400 m relay team in the same championships, the Canadian team was disqualified in the final. She went on to compete as part of the Canadian Olympic team at the 2020 Summer Olympics in Tokyo. The 4x400 m relay team finished in fourth place.

References

External links
 
 

1995 births
Living people
Canadian female sprinters
World Athletics Championships athletes for Canada
Athletes (track and field) at the 2020 Summer Olympics
Olympic track and field athletes of Canada
Sportspeople from Palo Alto, California
Duke Blue Devils women's track and field athletes